Dhoomam is a 1985 Indian Malayalam film,  directed by Chandrasekharan Thampi. The film stars O. P. Pillai, M. P. Jose, Sureshbabu and K. K. Kurup in the lead roles.

Cast

O. P. Pillai
M. P. Jose
Sureshbabu
K. K. Kurup
P. P. Sivadas
P. I. Chandrasekharan
Jaya
Leela
Valsa James
Gopakumar
Ammini

References

External links
 

1985 films
1980s Malayalam-language films